The 9th Annual International Stoke Mandeville Games, retroactively designated as the 1960 Summer Paralympics, were the first international Paralympic Games, following on from the Stoke Mandeville Games of 1948 and 1952. They were organised under the aegis of the International Stoke Mandeville Games Federation. The term "Paralympic Games" was approved by the International Olympic Committee (IOC) first in 1984, while the International Paralympic Committee (IPC) was formed in 1989.

The Games were held in Rome, Italy from September 18 to 25, 1960, with the 1960 Summer Olympics. The only disability included in these Paralympics was spinal cord injury. There were 400 athletes from 23 countries.

Organisation 
Dr. Ludwig Guttmann, the founder of the Stoke Mandeville Games along with Antonio Maglio, head of the Spinal Centre in Rome organised the event which was the first Stoke Mandeville Games to be held outside the UK.

Sports 

 Archery
 Athletics
 Dartchery
 Snooker
 Swimming
 Table tennis
 Wheelchair basketball
 Wheelchair fencing

Medal table 

The top 10 NPCs by number of gold medals are listed below. The host nation, Italy, is highlighted.

Participating delegations 
The number in parentheses indicates the number of participants from each NPC. Canada, Cyprus, Denmark, Egypt, Greece, India, Lebanon, Pakistan, Portugal, Turkey and Uruguay sent only officials.

References 

The information from the International Paralympic Committee (IPC) website is based on sources which does not present all information from earlier paralympic games (1960-1984), such as relay and team members. (Per Apr.17, 2011)

External links
 on ParalympicSport.tv's Official site on YouTube
 on Australian Paralympic Committee's Official site on YouTube

 
Paralympics
Summer Paralympics, 1960
Sports competitions in Rome
Paralympics
Multi-sport events in Italy
Summer Paralympic Games
Paralympic Games
September 1960 sports events in Europe
1960s in Rome